Bonus Family is a Swedish drama series created by  Felix Herngren, Moa Herngren, Clara Herngren, and Calle Marthin for SVT. The series debuted in 2017, with a second season in 2018. A third season of the series launched on both SVT and Netflix in 2019. The series won a Kristallen award in 2017 for "Best TV-drama". SVT announced that it has ordered a fourth season. Season 4 began streaming on Netflix on the 14th of December. On December 15, 2021, it was reported that shooting had begun on a Bonus Family film, Länge leve Bonusfamiljen, to be released in December 2022.

Synopsis 
Lisa (Vera Vitali) and Patrik (Erik Johansson), a couple in their 30s living in Stockholm, are each recently divorced; both have 10-year-old sons, and Lisa has a teenage daughter. Patrik's ex-wife Katja (Petra Mede) is an architect, and Lisa's ex-husband Martin (Fredrik Hallgren) works at a bed retailer. The series follows the turbulent relationships between the new couple and their exes, as well as the three kids' adjustments to their new family situation and how Patrik deals with the contrast between his quiet, diligent son William (Jacob Lundquist) and Lisa's troublesome, adventurous son Eddie (Frank Dorsin).

Cast and characters

Main
Vera Vitali as Lisa Johansson: Martin's ex-wife
 as  Patrik: a school teacher, Katja's ex-husband
Petra Mede (series 1‒3) / Emma Peters (pilot + series 4) as Katja; architect, Patrik's ex-wife
Fredrik Hallgren as Martin: a sales clerk, Lisa's ex-husband
Frank Dorsin as Eddie: Lisa and Martin's 10-year-old son
Amanda Lindh as Bianca: Lisa and Martin's 15-year-old daughter
Jacob Lundqvist as William: Patrik and Katja's 10-year-old son

Recurring
Marianne Mörck as Birgitta ("Bigge"): Martin's mother
Christer Lindarw as Danny, co-worker of Martin
Barbro Svensson as Gunvor ("Gugge"): Birgitta's girlfriend
Ann Petrén as Ylva: Lisa and Patrik's marriage co-counselor
Johan Ulveson as Jan: Lisa and Patrik's other marriage co-counselor
Martin Luuk as Filip Kron: a school counsellor at Patrik's school, Patrik's friend and confidant.
Leo Razzak as Sebastian ("Sebbe"): Martin's co-worker at a mattress store.
Felix Engström as Micael Schmidt: Katja's boss and sexual harasser/former love interest.
Niklas Engdahl as Henrik: Katja's co-worker and boyfriend.
Ida Engvoll as Therese ("Tessan"): a clothing store worker at the same shopping centre as Martin's mattress store and briefly Martin's girlfriend.
Dakota Trancher Williams as Matteo: Bianca's boyfriend
Dragomir Mrsic as Branco: Martial arts teacher and Katja's boyfriend (season 2)
Regina Lund as Emma: Lisa's sister
Nour El Refai as Sima, Martin’s domestic partner
Hanna Dorsin as   Tuula, a midwife

Episodes

Season 1 (2017)

Season 2 (2018)

Season 3 (2019)

Season 4 (2021)

Release 
Streaming service Netflix purchased rights to broadcast Bonus Family from production company FLX in April 2017.
As of July, 2019, seasons 1-3 are available in most countries on Netflix. A notable exception is in the Nordic countries, where only series 1 is currently offered on paid platform.

External links

References

Swedish television shows
Swedish television sitcoms
2017 Swedish television series debuts
Television shows set in Stockholm
Swedish-language television shows